Ioannis Sidiropoulos (born 1 September 1956) is a Greek weightlifter. He competed at the 1980 Summer Olympics and the 1988 Summer Olympics.

References

1956 births
Living people
Greek male weightlifters
Olympic weightlifters of Greece
Weightlifters at the 1980 Summer Olympics
Weightlifters at the 1988 Summer Olympics
Place of birth missing (living people)